Henry Kumler Sr. (1775–1854) was a bishop of the Church of the United Brethren in Christ in the USA, elected in 1825.

He was buried in Miltonville near Trenton, Ohio.

See also
List of bishops of the United Methodist Church

References

American bishops
Bishops of the Evangelical United Brethren Church
1775 births
1854 deaths
American United Brethren in Christ
Ministers of the Evangelical United Brethren Church
Burials in Ohio